Uludağ, the ancient Mysian or Bithynian Olympus (Greek: Όλυμπος), is a mountain in Bursa Province, Turkey, with an elevation of .

In Turkish, Uludağ means "great mountain". In ancient times the range of which it is a part, extending along the southern edge of Bithynia, was known as Olympos in Greek and Olympus in Latin, the western extremity being known as the Mysian Olympus and the eastern as the Bithynian Olympus, and the city of Bursa was known as Prusa ad Olympum from its position near the mountain. Throughout the Middle Ages, it contained hermitages and monasteries: "The rise of this monastic centre in the 8th c. and its prestige up to the 11th are linked to the resistance of numerous monks to the policy of the iconoclast emperors and then to a latent opposition to the urban, Constantinopolitan monasticism of the Studites." One of the greatest monks of the Christian East, the wonder-working Byzantine monk Saint Joannicius the Great, lived as a hermit on this mountain.

Mt. Uludağ is the highest mountain of the Marmara region. To the north are high plateaus: Sarıalan, Kirazlıyayla, Kadıyayla, and Sobra.

There is an abandoned wolfram mine near the summit. The mine and the integrated plant, which were built in 1974 for US$60 million, were closed in 1989 due to high production costs.
The area is a popular center for winter sports such as skiing, and a national park of rich flora and fauna. Summer activities, such as trekking and camping, also are popular.

Uludağ National Park Turkey 

The highest area in western Anatolia, Uludağ is easily ascended by car or cable-car. Bursa can be reached by road from Istanbul. The cable-car ascends from Bursa and has an intermediate stop in the alpine meadows of Kadiyayla at about  elevation.

Habitats of the park range from oak savanna, lowland deciduous forest and isolated maquis, through beech and fir mixed forest, to alpine meadows at the highest levels. It is a refuge for mountain birds, such as lammergeier and other vultures, golden eagle and more than 20 other raptor species. Other high-altitude species include alpine accentor, rock thrushes and choughs. The area is also good for eastern specialities such as isabelline wheatear, and, at almost the most westerly points of their range, red-fronted serin and Krüper's nuthatch. The dense fir forest holds short-toed treecreeper, common crossbill and Tengmalm's owl, a rare and very local bird in Turkey, as well as the white-backed woodpecker. 
The rare and local butterfly, Parnassius apollo graslini, is found on Uludag and the area has much of interest to botanists, with colourful pink primroses (Primula vulgaris var. sibthorpii), leopard's bane (Doronicum orientale), crocuses: the purple Crocus siberi and yellow Crocus flavus, and grape hyacinths (Muscari racemosum). There are also few wolf packs roaming on the mountain.

International winter sports events hosted
The ski resort hosted CEV Snow Volleyball European Tour events in 2017 and 2018.

Gallery

See also
 List of Ultras of West Asia
 Bursa Uludağ Gondola
 Battle of Mount Olympus

References

External links

 
 Slope and elevation information for Uludağ
 Uludağ Photographs
 Uludağ Ski Center Plan
 All About Turkey
 "Uludag Tepe" on Peakbagger

Mountains of Turkey
Landforms of Bursa Province
National parks of Turkey
Ski areas and resorts in Turkey
Tourist attractions in Bursa Province
Two-thousanders of Turkey
Important Bird Areas of Turkey
Former Christian monasteries in Turkey
Byzantine monasteries in Turkey
Mountains associated with Byzantine monasticism